Karla Frister is a retired German coxswain who won four medals at the European championships of 1958–1962.

References

Year of birth missing (living people)
Living people
East German female rowers
Coxswains (rowing)
European Rowing Championships medalists